Arne Jansson was a Swedish sprint canoeist who competed in the early 1950s. He won two medals at the 1950 ICF Canoe Sprint World Championships in Copenhagen with a silver in the K-4 10000 m and a bronze in the K-1 10000 m events.

References

Possibly living people
Swedish male canoeists
Year of birth missing
ICF Canoe Sprint World Championships medalists in kayak